Chleuastochoerus is an extinct genus in the pig family that lived in the Miocene and Pliocene in Russia and Eastern Asia.

References

Prehistoric Suidae
Miocene mammals of Asia
Miocene even-toed ungulates
Prehistoric even-toed ungulate genera